Haliophyle ferruginea is a moth of the family Noctuidae. It was first described by Otto Herman Swezey in 1932. It is endemic to the Hawaiian island of Maui.

External links

Hadeninae
Endemic moths of Hawaii